Khuenre (Khuenra) was a Prince of ancient Egypt of the 4th Dynasty, named after the Sun god Ra.

Biography 
He was a son of Pharaoh Menkaure and his sister, Queen Khamerernebty II. He was a grandson of Khafre and Khamerernebty I and great-grandson of Khufu, the king who built the Great Pyramid of Giza.

He was a secretary and "sole companion of his father".

He was the eldest son of his parents, but he was not Menkaure’s successor. This was Shepseskaf.

Khuenre is buried in Menkaure’s cemetery (MQ 1). He is depicted as a young boy standing in front of his seated mother on the south wall.

Sources

Princes of the Fourth Dynasty of Egypt
Menkaure